The Rogožarski SIM-XIV-H was a 1930s Yugoslav coastal reconnaissance floatplane and light bomber, twin-engined, with three crew members. It was designed and built at the Rogožarski factory in Belgrade.

Design and development
In January 1937, the Yugoslav Navy Air Service issued a specification for a twin-engined coastal reconnaissance aircraft, to replace the Ikarus IO flying boat.

To meet this requirement, Rogozarski proposed the SIM-XIV-H, a twin-engined floatplane designed by Sima Milutinović, and this type was selected by the Yugoslav navy, with the first prototype making its maiden flight on 8 February 1938.

The SIM-XIV-H was a low winged monoplane of mixed wood and metal construction, with an oval section monocoque fuselage. The wing was braced to the fuselage by steel-tube struts, with the tail also braced. It had a glazed nose, with a gun turret armed with a single machine gun mounted above the nose.  The pilot and radio operator/gunner sat in tandem under a long canopy, with the observer also armed with a single machine gun. The rear fuselage was fabric covered, while the moving tail surfaces were metal clad. The elliptical wing was of wooden construction, and was clad in plywood. It was powered by two 240 hp (179 kW) Argus As 10C air-cooled V8 engines driving fixed two-bladed propellers, also designed by engineer Sima Milutinović. Two Alclad floats made by the EDO Corporation were attached to the engine nacelles and fuselage.

The basic aircraft weapons were anti-submarine bombs, of which the plane could carry one 100 kg bomb or two 50 kg. For anti-personnel action the plane could carry 12 fragmentation bombs massing 12 kg each. Typically, the aircraft was armed with two machine guns on board: one placed in the nose to by operated by the observer and the other in the rear gunner's cockpit. Bombsights were made in Yugoslavia and the bombing of Viro in low flight also Brilet local sights.

Testing of the prototype was successful, with the aircraft demonstrating good handling, and the type was ordered into production.  The first batch of six SIM-XIV-H, known as the Series O, differed from the prototype in having the turret removed from the nose and the tail modified. The second batch of six aircraft, the Series 1, had a cantilever wing, eliminating the bracing between the wing and the fuselage, and had 270 hp (201 kW) Argus As-10 engines driving metal two-pitch propellers.
 
A third batch of 12 aircraft was ordered in 1940, with 450 hp (336 kW) Argus As 410, but construction was interrupted by the German invasion of Yugoslavia in 1941. Plans for a landplane trainer adaptation of the SIM-XIV-H were also abandoned.

Operational history
All the SIM-XIV-H and SIM XIVB-Hs were deployed to the naval bases at Divulje (near Split) and Kumbor (Kotor). Before Yugoslavia entered the war, they were used to carry out the duties for which they were designed, with intense training activity due to the approaching threat of war. In that period, three aircraft were destroyed, with 16 aircraft remaining in service when the Germans invaded Yugoslavia

These aircraft were used in the April war in operations against the Germans and Italians along the Adriatic coast, carrying out reconnaissance and aiding mining operations. Five aircraft were destroyed in the fight against the attacking forces. Four aircraft attempted to escape to Greece, of which two were destroyed and two reached British bases in Egypt via Crete. These two aircraft were used for reconnaissance missions over the Mediterranean Sea until one was lost and the other scrapped because of lack of spares.  Italy seized a total of eight aircraft, a SIM-XIV-H and 7 SIM-XIVB-Hs. One specimen was immediately transferred to the Test Center at Vigna di Valle, where it showed better results than found in testing in Yugoslavia while the others were transferred to the aeronautical school at Orbetello, continuing in use for training and communications purposes until the end of 1942.

Operators

Royal Yugoslav Navy - 19 aircraft

Regia Aeronautica - 8 aircraft

Royal Air Force -  2 aircraft.

Variants
Rogožarski SIM-XIV-H
First variant with two Argus As-10C engines 240 hp, six built in 1939
Rogožarski SIM-XIVB-H
Second variant with two Argus As-10E engines 270 hp, 12 built in 1940.

Specifications

guns: 2x7,9 mm
bombs: 1 х 100 kg; or  2 x 50 kg; or 12 x 12 kg

See also

Notes

References

External links

Рогожарски СИМ-XIV-Х 
www.airwar.ru
Rogozarski SIM-XIV-H panzercentral.com

SIM-XIV-H
1930s Yugoslav bomber aircraft
Floatplanes
Low-wing aircraft
Twin piston-engined tractor aircraft